Deadly Little Christmas is a 2009 direct-to-video horror film directed by Novin Shakiba, and written by Jeremiah Campbell.

Plot 

On Christmas Day, a young boy named Devin Merriman is institutionalized after being found covered in blood and clutching a knife, having apparently murdered his father and the housekeeper after walking in on the two of them having sex. Fifteen years later, Devin escapes, just as a figure in a red mask begins committing a series of seemingly random murders, the victims including two teenagers, an elderly person, and a pair of police officers.

After a Christmas Eve play headed by Devin's sisters, Taylor and Noel, is finished at the community centre, Noel's boyfriend Steve is killed. The next morning, the Merriman sisters receive a call from their mother, who demands they come to the community centre. Concerned with their mother's odd behavior as of late, the girls call the police before heading out. Arriving at the centre first is Detective Hughes, who is confronted and stabbed by the hysterical Mrs. Merriman. When Taylor and Noel arrive, they find the bodies of all the recent victims seated at a table in a mockery of The Last Supper, and their mother and Devin, the latter claiming that Mrs. Merriman is the killer of their father and everyone else, and that she framed him due to being a misandrist; the girls at first refuse to believe Devin, until they notice the blood coating their mother's arms. When Mrs. Merriman pulls out a knife, Devin disarms her, but she manages to grab Detective Hughes's dropped gun. Before Mrs. Merriman can fire it, Taylor wrestles the gun away from her, and shoots her in the head when she charges forward.

Cast

Reception 

Deadly Little Christmas has been met with widespread disdain by critics, who complained about the poor performances, plodding storyline, weak cinematography and derivative plot.

References

External links 

 

2000s Christmas horror films
2009 films
American slasher films
American Christmas horror films
2009 horror films
Films set in California
Direct-to-video horror films
Films shot in Los Angeles
2000s English-language films
2000s American films